The 2007 European Junior Badminton Championships were held in Hermann-Neuberger-Halle, Völklingen town, Saarbrücken district, Germany, between 31 March and 8 April 2007.

Medal summary

Medalists

Medal table

References

External links
Badminton Europe: 2007 European Junior Championships
TournamentSoftware.com: Individual Results
TournamentSoftware.com: Team Results

European Junior Badminton Championships
European Junior Badminton Championships
European Junior Badminton Championships
European Junior Badminton Championships